The Cleaner is a British television sitcom that premiered on BBC One on 10 September 2021. The series is based on the German comedy Der Tatortreiniger. The show was renewed for a second season and a Christmas special, which aired on 23 December 2022.

Plot
Paul "Wicky" Wickstead, a Government-certified cleaning technician, is responsible for the removal of any signs of death from crime scenes. In the course of his work, he gets to know a variety of people.

Cast

Main
 Greg Davies as Paul "Wicky" Wickstead, a crime scene cleaner who visits various people each episode (all episodes)
 Zita Sattar as Ruth, a police officer who is close friends with Wicky. (E1, E4, E6)

Guest cast
 Helena Bonham Carter as Sheila. Sheila met her husband in business school, however after she married him she found herself bored. Sheila and her husband were married for at least 35 years. One day, after having reached the limit with her husband she killed him. After meeting Wicky, they planned to go on holiday and then Sheila would turn herself in, but Wicky called the police at the last minute and Sheila was arrested. (E1)
 Shobu Kapoor as Neeta, Sheila’s neighbour. She loves to bake and is extremely judgemental to any woman she meets who dislikes or doesn’t do baking. (E1)
 Georgie Glen as Mrs Gathernoid, a fan of Terence's work who claims to invite him to an award ceremony, but he sees through her (E2)
 David Mitchell as Terence Redford, a struggling writer who is hostile to Wicky (E2)
 Ruth Madeley as Helena, a young woman in a wheelchair who is vegan and has recently broken up with her partner. (E3)
 Stephanie Cole as Vivienne Hosier, an aristocrat who is very proud of her estate, especially her sofa, of which she deems precious to her family history and notes many famous people who sat there (E4)
 Donald Sumpter as Sir James, a close friend of Vivienne’s who is quite traditional. (E4)
 Layton Williams as 'Hosea' (Bernard), a young social media influencer who has an affinity with 1980s’ culture, despite not having seen Back to the Future (E5)
 Jo Hartley as Maggie (E6)
 Esmonde Cole as Tony
 Barry Castagnola as Weasel
 Sian Gibson as Wicky's sister (Christmas special)
 James Bolam as Wicky's father (Christmas special)
 Robbie Curran as Robert Kendrick (Christmas special)

Episode list

Series 1

Christmas special

Notes

References

External links
 
 
 
 

BBC television sitcoms
2021 British television series debuts
2020s British sitcoms
English-language television shows
Television shows set in Shropshire